Revenko, also Revenco, is a Ukrainian surname. Notable people with the surname include:

 Ana Revenco (born 1977), Moldovan politician
 Vladyslav Revenko (born 1984), Ukrainian pole vaulter
 Yevgeny Revenko (born 1972), Russian politician

See also
 

Romanian-language surnames
Ukrainian-language surnames